ABC Sport is the name given to the Australian Broadcasting Corporation's sport programming broadcasts on ABC Television and ABC Radio. From November 2020 the brand includes the former ABC Radio Grandstand.

, ABC Sport is a section of the ABC News website (part of ABC Online).

Television

Past

Sports news programs

The program Offsiders is first broadcast on ABC on Sunday mornings and reviews and debates the previous week's action.  ABC News has Grandstand TV hosted by Peter Wilkins on weeknights at 5:30 pm.

Radio
ABC Sport also hold the radio rights to several Australian and international sporting events, including Australian Football League, National Rugby League, A-League, Olympics, Australian international cricket games and selected Ford Ranger One-Day Cup games, amongst other major sporting events.

Staff and commentators

Victorian Football League

Past

 Darrem Boyd (Commentator)
 Peter Donegan (Commentator)
 Peter Marcato (Commentator)
 David Lithgow (Commentator)
 David Rhys-Jones (Commentator)
 Phil Cleary (Expert Commentator/Boundary Commentator, 1991–2014)
 Gary Ayres
 Peta Searle
 Ed Lower
 Gerald Fitzgerald
 Andy Collins
 Rob Waters (Commentators)
 Ross Booth (Boundary Commentator)

See also

Seven Sport
Nine's Wide World of Sports
10 Sport
SBS Sport
Fox Sports (Australia)
List of Australian television series
List of longest running Australian television series
Sports broadcasting contracts in Australia

References

External links
Official Site
Corporate Site
Australian Broadcasting Corporation

1956 establishments in Australia
Australian Broadcasting Corporation divisions
Sports divisions of TV channels